(also written 2015 YQ1) is an Apollo asteroid that is a temporary horseshoe companion to the Earth, the twelfth known Earth horseshoe librator. It experienced a close encounter with the Earth on 2015 December 22 at 0.0037 AU.

Discovery 

 was discovered on 2015 December 19 by A. D. Grauer observing with the 1.5-m reflector telescope at the Mount Lemmon Survey. As of 9 March 2016, it has been observed 64 times with an observation arc of 3 days.

Orbit and orbital evolution 

 is currently an Apollo asteroid (Earth-crossing but with a period greater than a year). Its semi-major axis (currently 1.00134 AU) is similar to that of Earth (1.00074 AU), but it has a relatively high eccentricity (0.40398) and low orbital inclination (2.4865°). It alternates between being an Aten asteroid and being an Apollo asteroid. As of 9 March 2016, this object is the 17th known Earth co-orbital and the 12th known object following a horseshoe path with respect to our planet. Asteroid  follows an asymmetrical horseshoe path with respect to our planet; the value of its relative mean longitude oscillates about 180°, but enclosing 0°; its orbital evolution is rather unstable.

Physical properties 

With an absolute magnitude of 28.1 mag, it has a diameter in the range 7–16 meters (for an assumed albedo range of 0.04–0.20, respectively).

See also 

 54509 YORP
 
 3753 Cruithne

Notes 

  This is assuming an albedo of 0.20–0.04.

References 

Further reading
 Understanding the Distribution of Near-Earth Asteroids Bottke, W. F., Jedicke, R., Morbidelli, A., Petit, J.-M., Gladman, B. 2000, Science, Vol. 288, Issue 5474, pp. 2190–2194.
 A Numerical Survey of Transient Co-orbitals of the Terrestrial Planets Christou, A. A. 2000, Icarus, Vol. 144, Issue 1, pp. 1–20.
 Debiased Orbital and Absolute Magnitude Distribution of the Near-Earth Objects Bottke, W. F., Morbidelli, A., Jedicke, R., Petit, J.-M., Levison, H. F., Michel, P., Metcalfe, T. S. 2002, Icarus, Vol. 156, Issue 2, pp. 399–433.
 Transient co-orbital asteroids Brasser, R., Innanen, K. A., Connors, M., Veillet, C., Wiegert, P., Mikkola, S., Chodas, P. W. 2004, Icarus, Vol. 171, Issue 1, pp. 102–109.
 A trio of horseshoes: past, present and future dynamical evolution of Earth co-orbital asteroids 2015 XX169, 2015 YA and 2015 YQ1 de la Fuente Marcos, C., de la Fuente Marcos, R. 2016, Astrophysics and Space Science, Vol. 361, Issue 4, article 121 (13 pp).

External links 
 MPEC 2015-Y53 : 2015 YQ1, Discovery Minor Planet Electronic Circular, (at ADS) 
  data at MPC
 
 
 

Minor planet object articles (unnumbered)
Earth-crossing asteroids

20151219